Southern Railway Depot, or variations such as  Southern Railway Passenger Station or Passenger Depot, Southern Railway Freight Depot or Freight Office, may refer to any of numerous railway stations operated by the U.S.-based Southern Railway or stations operated by other Southern Railway companies.

In the United States, these include:

Alabama 
 Southern Railway Terminal Station (Bessemer, Alabama), listed on the National Register of Historic Places (NRHP)
 Southern Railway Depot (Decatur, Alabama), listed on the NRHP
 Southern Railway System Depot (Huntsville, Alabama), listed on the NRHP
 Southern Railway Depot (Piedmont, Alabama), listed on the NRHP

Georgia 
 Southern Railway Freight Depot (Columbus, Georgia), listed on the NRHP
 Southern Railway North Avenue Yards Historic District, Atlanta, listed on the NRHP
 Peachtree Southern Railway Station, Atlanta, listed on the NRHP
 Toccoa station, a train station in Toccoa, Georgia

Kentucky 
 Southern Railway Passenger Depot (Lexington, Kentucky), listed on the NRHP

Louisiana 
 Southern Railway Freight Office (New Orleans, Louisiana), listed on the NRHP

Missouri 
 Poplar Bluff (Amtrak station)

North Carolina 
 Southern Railway Passenger Depot (Asheville, North Carolina), listed on the NRHP
 Southern Railway Passenger Station (Burlington, North Carolina), listed on the NRHP
 Greensboro (Amtrak station)
 Southern Railway Depot (North Wilkesboro, North Carolina), listed on the NRHP

South Carolina 
 Southern Railway Depot (Batesburg-Leesville, South Carolina), listed on the NRHP
 Southern Railway Passenger Depot (Branchville, South Carolina), listed on the NRHP
 Southern Railway Depot (Ninety Six, South Carolina), listed on the NRHP
 Southern Railway Passenger Station (Westminster, South Carolina), listed on the NRHP

Tennessee 
 Southern Railway Freight Depot (Chattanooga, Tennessee), listed on the NRHP
 Cleveland Southern Railway Depot, Cleveland, listed on the NRHP
 Southern Railroad Freight Depot, Maryville, listed on the NRHP
 Southern Railway Industrial Historic District, Memphis, listed on the NRHP

Virginia 
 Southern Railway Depot (Richmond, Virginia), a passenger depot built in 1900 and demolished in 1914
 Danville (Amtrak station), listed on the NRHP

See also
 Southern Railway's Spencer Shops, Spencer, North Carolina, listed on the NRHP
 Southern Terminal, Knoxville, Tennessee